"Fotoromanza" is a song composed by Gianna Nannini, Conny Plank and Raffaella Riva (a member of the pop group Gruppo Italiano) and performed by Gianna Nannini. 
The single peaked at first place  for four consecutive weeks in September 1984 on the Italian hit parade. It won the 1984 edition of Festivalbar and also won "Vota la Voce", a musical event organized by the magazine TV Sorrisi e Canzoni. The music video of the song was directed by the  Academy Award winner Michelangelo Antonioni.
 
The song was later covered by several artists, including Ricchi e Poveri and Iva Zanicchi, and sampled by rapper Marracash for his song "Fotoromanzo". It was included in the soundtrack of the Gianni Amelio's drama film The Stolen Children.

Track listing
7" single – PSRL 10999   
 "Fotoromanza" (Gianna Nannini, Conny Plank, Raffaella Riva) -  	4:27
 "Venerdì notte" (Gianna Nannini) -  	3:10

References

 

1984 singles
Italian songs
Number-one singles in Italy
1984 songs
Gianna Nannini songs
Songs written by Gianna Nannini